Turraea socotrana is a species of plant in the family Meliaceae. It is endemic to Yemen.  Its natural habitat is rocky areas.

References

Endemic flora of Socotra
socotrana
Vulnerable plants
Taxonomy articles created by Polbot